The following is a list of characters and vehicles from the M.A.S.K. media franchise, including the toyline and its television adaptation. The toyline lasted longer than the cartoon series.

Toylines
There were five different lines of toys released. Some packaging was altered for the European market to make the line seem less violent, such as revising box art so that vehicles' weapons were not shown firing, or, in several cases, changing vehicle names entirely. Additionally, Europe received 4 adventure packs that were not released in North America, as well as several extra action figure two-packs with redecoed figures.

M.A.S.K. members and their vehicles
M.A.S.K. (short for Mobile Armored Strike Kommand) is the titular protagonists who fight the forces of V.E.N.O.M. Among its known members are:

V.E.N.O.M. members and their vehicles
V.E.N.O.M. (short for Vicious Evil Network Of Mayhem) is a criminal organization against which M.A.S.K. fights. V.E.N.O.M.'s primary goal was obtaining money through either robbery, extortion, counterfeiting, and kidnapping, or attempting to steal historical artifacts. Among its known members are:

Other toys

Notes

References

External links
 Complete toyline release history at Albert Penello's MASK Page
 MASK Characters

Fictional characters introduced in 1985
Action figures
Toy cars and trucks
1980s toys
Transforming toys
Lists of toy characters
Hasbro characters